Samia Amin (24 March 1945 – 2 August 2020) (Arabic: سامية أمين) was an Egyptian actress.

Career 
Amin started her career in 1967, and played roles such as a Sa'idi woman and a farmer. During her career, she participated in more than 30 theatre and TV works. One of her most famous roles was her performance in the television series . Her son is the Egyptian actor .

Death 
Amin died on 2 August 2020, aged 75.

References

20th-century Egyptian actresses
Egyptian stage actresses
Egyptian television actresses
1945 births
2020 deaths
Actresses from Cairo
Place of death missing